Johannes Gezelius the elder (3 February 1615 – 20 January 1690), known in Swedish as Johannes Gezelius den äldre and Johannes Gezelius vanhempi in Finnish, was the Bishop of Turku and the Vice-Chancellor of The Royal Academy of Turku (1664–1690).

Biography
Gezelius  was born at  Tillberga in the parish of Romfartuna (now Västerås) in Västmanland, Sweden. Gezelius was a peasant's son, but was observed in childhood to have apparent gifts and was given a personal tutor, Boetius Murenius.  After studying in Västerås (1626) and at the Uppsala University (1632),  he graduated in Academia Gustaviana (now the University of Tartu in Tartu, Estonia) with a Master of Arts degree in 1641.  His first professorship  was of Greek and oriental languages at Tartu in 1642. Subsequently, he worked as a grammar school in Västerås as a lecturer in theology and vicar at Stora Skedvi in Säter, Sweden. Gezelius was appointed Superintendent of Livonia at Riga in 1660 and the Swedish parish vicar at Riga. He received his Doctor of Theology at Uppsala University in 1661 and was named Bishop of Turku and the Vice-Chancellor of The Royal Academy of Turku in 1664.

Gezelius published a number of textbooks and devoted his thesis in theology. In 1666, he  published En rätt barnaklenodium, which went through 70 editions over the next two centuries.
In 1672, Gezelius published Encyclopaedia synoptica: ex optimis & accuratissimis philosophorum scriptis collecta,  a three-piece Latin encyclopaedia which specifically dealt with fields of philosophy and mathematics. Encyclopaedia synoptica is considered to be Finland's first encyclopedic work.
Johannes Gezelius the elder was known as an opponent  of Finnish paganism and in 1673  ordered the destruction of  spells.

See also
Johannes Gezelius the younger (1647–1718), bishop of Turku 1690–1718 
Johannes Gezelius the youngest (1686–1733), Bishop of Porvoo 1721–1733

References

External links

1615 births
1690 deaths
People from Västmanland
17th-century Swedish Lutheran priests
Uppsala University alumni
University of Tartu  alumni
Swedish educators
17th-century Finnish Lutheran clergy
Finnish Lutheran theologians
17th-century Protestant theologians
Lutheran archbishops and bishops of Turku